American private space transportation company SpaceX has developed and produced several spacecraft named Dragon. The first family member, now referred to as Dragon 1, flew 23 cargo missions to the ISS between 2010 and 2020 before being retired.  With this first version not designed for carrying astronauts, it was funded by NASA with $396 million awarded through the Commercial Orbital Transportation Services (COTS) program, with SpaceX being announced as a winner of the first round of funding on August 18, 2006.

SpaceX developed its Dragon 2 spacecraft starting in 2014, with a cargo version and a crewed version.  It entered service in 2019 with the Demo-1 flight, and performed its first flight with astronauts on May 30, 2020, during the Crew Dragon Demo-2 flight.

SpaceX also investigated a version named Red Dragon for Mars exploration, but the project did not go forward.

A version named Dragon XL Is proposed to provide Gateway Logistics Services to the Lunar Gateway.

Name 
SpaceX's CEO, Elon Musk, named the spacecraft after the 1963 song "Puff, the Magic Dragon" by Peter, Paul and Mary, reportedly as a response to critics who considered his spaceflight projects impossible.  Early on, it had actually been named Magic Dragon, and t-shirts had been printed with this name.  As late as September 2012, SpaceX board member Steve Jurvetson was still referring to it as "The Magic Dragon, Puffed to the sea."  That was his caption to a photo of the capsule several months after it had completed its COTS 2 demo flight where the spacecraft had accomplished its first docking with the ISS.  This song, ostensibly composed for children, had long been associated with perceived references to smoking marijuana. In 2008, Elon Musk confirmed that the association between the song and marijuana was the reason behind the name for Dragon, saying that "so many people thought I [must be] smoking weed to do this venture."

Dragon 1 

Dragon 1 was the original Dragon iteration, providing cargo service to the ISS. It flew 23 missions between 2010 and 2020, when it was retired.

Dragon 2 

Starting in 2014, SpaceX developed SpaceX Dragon 2. Dragon 2 has a crewed variant and a cargo variant. It began providing service in 2019.

Red Dragon 

Red Dragon was a cancelled version of the Dragon spacecraft that had been previously proposed to fly farther than Earth orbit and transit to Mars via interplanetary space. In addition to SpaceX's own privately funded plans for an eventual Mars mission, NASA Ames Research Center had developed a concept called Red Dragon: a low-cost Mars mission that would use Falcon Heavy as the launch vehicle and trans-Martian injection vehicle, and the SpaceX Dragon 2-based capsule to enter the atmosphere of Mars. The concept was originally envisioned for launch in 2018 as a NASA Discovery mission, then alternatively for 2022, but was never formally submitted for funding within NASA. The mission would have been designed to return samples from Mars to Earth at a fraction of the cost of NASA's own sample-return mission, which was projected in 2015 to cost US$6 billion.

On 27 April 2016, SpaceX announced its plan to go ahead and launch a modified Dragon lander to Mars in 2018. However, Musk canceled the Red Dragon program in July 2017 to focus on developing the Starship system instead. Preliminary analysis showed that the capsule's atmospheric drag would slow it enough for the final stage of its descent to be within the abilities of its SuperDraco retro-propulsion thrusters.

Dragon XL 

On 27 March 2020, SpaceX revealed the Dragon XL resupply spacecraft to carry pressurized and unpressurized cargo, experiments and other supplies to NASA's planned Lunar Gateway under a Gateway Logistics Services (GLS) contract. The equipment delivered by Dragon XL missions could include sample collection materials, spacesuits and other items astronauts may need on the Gateway and on the surface of the Moon, according to NASA. It will launch on SpaceX Falcon Heavy rockets from LC-39A at the Kennedy Space Center in Florida. The Dragon XL will stay at the Gateway for 6 to 12 months at a time, when research payloads inside and outside the cargo vessel could be operated remotely, even when crews are not present. There is no requirement for a return to Earth. At the end of the mission the Dragon XL must be able to undock and dispose of the same mass it can bring to the Gateway, by moving the spacecraft to a heliocentric orbit.

See also 

 Comparison of space station cargo vehicles
 List of human spaceflight programs
 Space Shuttle successors

References 

 
Dragon
Cargo spacecraft
Dragon
Vehicles introduced in 2010
Commercial spaceflight
Reusable spacecraft